Guy Edward Porter (born on 23 January 1997) is an English rugby union player who plays for Leicester Tigers in Premiership Rugby. His playing position is centre.

Early life and education
Born in London, England, he started playing rugby for Rosslyn Park in south London. He moved with his family to Australia at the age of seven.

He studied law at Sydney University.

Career
Porter came through the Australian rugby union system.
He played for Sydney University, captaining the team in his final year. After then playing for Sydney Stars and Sydney Rays in Australia’s National Rugby Championship, in September 2019 Porter signed for the Brumbies. The covid pandemic caused the suspension of the 2020 Super Rugby season.

Porter signed for English club Leicester Tigers on 20 July 2020, and made his debut on 22 August 2020 against Bath at Welford Road.
On 26 December 2021 Porter scored the winning try on the final play of the match as Leicester beat Bristol 28-26.  Porter extended his contract with Leicester on 1 February 2022, and was named as the Leicester Mercury's man of the match for his performance against Worcester Warriors on 5 February.
Porter started the 2022 Premiership Rugby final at inside centre, Porter's defence was crucial as Leicester won 15-12 against Saracens.

In June 2022 Porter received his first call-up to the senior England squad by coach Eddie Jones. Named on the bench for the first test Porter was an unused substitute as England lost 30–28, but started the second test at centre, making his debut in a 25–17 England win. 

Porter was injured and therefore not included in the initial squad for the 2023 Six Nations Championship, but was called up to replace his Leicester Tigers team-mate Dan Kelly in the week before the tournament started, due to a thigh injury ruling Kelly out

International tries 
As of 13 November 2022

Reference list

External links

Rugby.com.au profile

1997 births
Living people
Rugby union centres
Leicester Tigers players
Sydney Stars players
Sydney (NRC team) players
ACT Brumbies players
Rugby union players from Kensington
English rugby union players
England international rugby union players